Phtheochroa purana is a species of moth of the family Tortricidae. It is found in France, Italy, Croatia, Bosnia and Herzegovina, Hungary, Romania and Asia Minor.

The wingspan is 14–16 mm. Adults have been recorded on wing from June to July.

The larvae feed on Cephalaria leucantha.

References

Moths described in 1845
Phtheochroa